Ivan Dodig and Marcelo Melo were the defending champions, but chose to compete in Dubai and São Paulo, respectively, instead.
Treat Huey and Max Mirnyi won the title, defeating Philipp Petzschner and Alexander Peya in the final, 7–6(7–5), 6–3.

Seeds

Draw

Draw

Qualifying

Seeds

Qualifiers
  Thiemo de Bakker /  Robin Haase

Qualifying draw

References
 Main Draw
 Qualifying Draw

2016 Abierto Mexicano Telcel